Albert Edward Thorpe (14 July 1910 – 1971) was an English footballer.

He played for Langwith Colliery, Shirebrook, Wolverhampton Wanderers, Mansfield Town, Notts County, Norwich City, Crystal Palace, Bath City, Scunthorpe & Lindsey United and Hereford United.

Notes

1910 births
1971 deaths
English footballers
Association football fullbacks
Wolverhampton Wanderers F.C. players
Mansfield Town F.C. players
Notts County F.C. players
Norwich City F.C. players
Crystal Palace F.C. players
Bath City F.C. players
Scunthorpe United F.C. players
Hereford United F.C. players
English Football League players
Shirebrook Miners Welfare F.C. players